The 2017–18 Florida Atlantic Owls women's basketball team represents Florida Atlantic University during the 2017–18 NCAA Division I women's basketball season. The Owls, led by first year head coach Jim Jabir, play their home games at FAU Arena and were members of Conference USA. They finished the season 13–15, 7–9 in C-USA play to finish in a 3 way tie for seventh place. They lost in the first round of the C-USA women's tournament to UTSA.

Roster

Schedule

|-
!colspan=9 style=| Exhibition

|-
!colspan=9 style=| Non-conference regular season

|-
!colspan=9 style=| Conference USA regular season

|-
!colspan=9 style=| Conference USA Women's Tournament

See also
2017–18 Florida Atlantic Owls men's basketball team

References

Florida Atlantic Owls women's basketball seasons
Florida Atlantic
Florida Atlantic Owls women's basketball
Florida Atlantic Owls women's basketball